is a Japanese actor and model. He began his modeling career in Japan, then entered Korean entertainment by being featured in a commercial for Dunkin' Donuts in 2003, followed by Hyundai Motors, Olympus and SK Telecom. His popularity helped him land roles on television, beginning with the 2006 sitcom Soulmate. Otani's acting career continued to be active in South Korea, starring in television dramas such as  The Road Home, Dear My Sister, Hero, The Chaser, and Gunman in Joseon that earned him Global Star Award in the 7th Korea Drama Awards as well as the period blockbusters War of the Arrows and The Admiral: Roaring Currents. He has currently been acting in Japan; starring in hit Japanese dramas like The Full-Time Wife Escapist as Ryota Kazami, Love Rerun as Ryosuke Sagisawa in 2018, and will be taking part in many more Japanese works later in 2018 as well.

Filmography

Television series
 Soulmate (MBC, 2006)
 Tokyo Sun Shower (SBS, 2008)
 Matchmaker's Lover  (KBS2, 2008) (cameo)
 The Road Home (KBS1, 2009)
 Dear My Sister (KBS2, 2012)
 Hero (OCN, 2012)
 The Chaser (SBS, 2012)
 Gu Family Book (MBC, 2013)
 Gunman in Joseon (KBS2, 2014)
 The Full-Time Wife Escapist (TBS, 2016)
 Chase (Amazon Video, 2017)
 Tokyo Alice (Amazon Video, 2017)
 Love Rerun (NTV, YTV, 2018)
 Manpuku (NHK, 2018)
 Miss Sherlock (HBO, 2018)
 No Side Manager (TBS, 2019)
 Scams (MBS, 2019)
 Reach Beyond the Blue Sky (NHK, 2021), Abe Masahiro
 Love You as the World Ends (NTV, 2021), Daiki Hongo

Film
 War of the Arrows (2011)
 The Admiral: Roaring Currents (2014)
 Roaring Currents: The Road of the Admiral (documentary, 2015)
 When I Get Home, My Wife Always Pretends to be Dead (2018)
 Zenigata (2018)
 My Dad is a Heel Wrestler (2018)
 Yakiniku Dragon (2018), Hasegawa
 Tezuka's Barbara (2019)
 You Are Brilliant Like a Spica (2019)
 Masked Ward (2020), Kosakai

Variety show
 Roommate - Season 2 (SBS, 2014–2015)
 2 Days & 1 Night - (KBS 2015)
 Cool Kiz On The Block - (KBS 2016)
 The Friends in Chiang Mai - (K-Star 2016)

Music video
 Jung Yeop - "Without You" (2010)
 Tablo - "Bad"  (2011)
 G.NA - "G.NA's Secret" (2014)
 Jonghyun - "End Of A Day" (2015)
 Kim Hyung Jung (singer) Big Brother Project (feat Kim BoA of Spica) - "Zero" (2015)
 Lil' Something - Chen x Heize (For SM Station Album) 2016

Awards
 2014 7th Korea Drama Awards: Global Star Award (Gunman in Joseon)
 2019 14th Osaka Cinema Festival: Best New Actor Award (Yakiniku Dragon)

References

External links
  
 
 

1980 births
Living people
People from Suita
Japanese male film actors
Japanese male television actors
Japanese male models
Japanese expatriates in South Korea
Mystic Entertainment artists
21st-century Japanese male actors